The 1997 Goodwrench Service 400 was the second stock car race of the 1997 NASCAR Winston Cup Series and the 32nd iteration of the event. The race was held on Sunday, February 23, 1997, in Rockingham, North Carolina, at North Carolina Speedway, a  permanent high-banked racetrack. The race took the scheduled 393 laps to complete. In the final laps of the race, Hendrick Motorsports driver Jeff Gordon would manage to make a late race pass on the dominant driver of the day, Robert Yates Racing driver Dale Jarrett to take his 21st career NASCAR Winston Cup Series victory and his second victory of the season. To fill out the podium, Jarrett and Roush Racing driver Jeff Burton would finish second and third, respectively.

Background 

North Carolina Speedway was opened as a flat, one-mile oval on October 31, 1965. In 1969, the track was extensively reconfigured to a high-banked, D-shaped oval just over one mile in length. In 1997, North Carolina Motor Speedway merged with Penske Motorsports, and was renamed North Carolina Speedway. Shortly thereafter, the infield was reconfigured, and competition on the infield road course, mostly by the SCCA, was discontinued. Currently, the track is home to the Fast Track High Performance Driving School.

Entry list 

 (R) denotes rookie driver.

Qualifying 
Qualifying was split into two rounds. The first round was held on Friday, February 21, at 2:00 PM EST. Each driver would have one lap to set a time. During the first round, the top 25 drivers in the round would be guaranteed a starting spot in the race. If a driver was not able to guarantee a spot in the first round, they had the option to scrub their time from the first round and try and run a faster lap time in a second round qualifying run, held on Saturday, February 22, at 11:30 AM EST. As with the first round, each driver would have one lap to set a time. Positions 26-38 would be decided on time, while positions 39-43 would be based on provisionals. Four spots are awarded by the use of provisionals based on owner's points. The fifth is awarded to a past champion who has not otherwise qualified for the race. If no past champion needs the provisional, the next team in the owner points will be awarded a provisional.

Four drivers would fail to qualify: Chad Little, Billy Standridge, Mike Wallace, and Gary Bradberry.

Full qualifying results

Race results

References 

1997 NASCAR Winston Cup Series
NASCAR races at Rockingham Speedway
February 1997 sports events in the United States
1997 in sports in North Carolina